The El Paso Women's Hall of Fame honors and recognizes the accomplishments of El Paso women. It is sponsored by the El Paso Commission for Women and was established in 1985. The first inductees were honored in 1990.

Inductees are women who live in El Paso and who have made a significant contribution and impact on the community. The Commission accepts nominations from the public. There are four honorary members, including Herlinda Chew, Polly Harris, Drusilla Nixon and Hedwig Schwartz. Streets in El Paso have been named after hall of fame inductees.

Inductees

Gallery

References

External links 
 El Paso Women's Hall of Fame

Women's halls of fame
History of El Paso, Texas
Halls of fame in Texas
Women's museums in Texas